Christopher Anderson (born 1970) is an American photographer. He is a member of Magnum Photos.

Early life
Anderson was born in Kelowna, British Columbia, Canada. He grew up in the west Texas town of Abilene.

Career
Christopher Anderson first gained recognition for his pictures in 1999 when he boarded a small wooden boat with Haitian refugees trying to sail to America. The boat, named the "Believe in God", sank in the Caribbean. In 2000 the images from that journey received the Robert Capa Gold Medal.

Anderson's early work from conflict zones such as Afghanistan, Iraq, Lebanon and Israel/ Palestine earned international acclaim and awards such as two World Press Photo Awards and Magazine Photographer of the Year.

In 2004, Anderson began traveling to Venezuela to document the country under the presidency of Hugo Chávez. The resulting book, Capitolio (RM 2009) was named one of the best photographic books of 2010 at the Kassels book Festival in Germany. In 2011, Anderson made Capitolio into an app for iPhone and iPad, the first photographic book to be made into an application for such devices. His current work crosses genres, from documentary to art to portraiture of celebrities (such as Lady Gaga) and fashion.

Anderson was one of the early members of the VII Photo Agency that was formed by photographers James Nachtwey and Antonín Kratochvíl in 2001. He resigned from the agency in 2004 and joined Magnum Photos in 2005. He has served as a contract photographer for Newsweek and National Geographic magazines and is currently the first "Photographer in Residence" at New York Magazine, working with editors Adam Moss and Jody Quon.

Books
Nonfiction. DeMo, 2003
Capitolio. RM, 2009
Sete # 12. Images En Manœuvres, 2012
Son. Heidelberg: Kehrer, 2013. .
Approximate Joy. Stanley Barker, 2018.
Pia. Stanley Barker, 2020. .
Second edition. Stanley Barker, 2021.

Awards
Kodak Young Photographer of the Year (1999)
Nominated for the Pulitzer Prize by The New York Times Magazine (2000)
Robert Capa Gold Medal (2000)
Magazine Photographer of the Year (2005)
Getty Grant (2008)
World Press Photo (2007)
World Press Photo (2008)

Exhibitions

Solo
2003 – Nonfiction, InCamera, New York
2010 – Capitolio
ImageSingulieres, Sete, France
Milk Gallery, New York
2010 – Moda, Moscow Contemporary Art Center Winzavod, Moscow, Russia
2011 – Son, LOOK3 Festival of the Photograph, Charlottesville, Virginia
2012 – Son, Magnum Gallery, Paris

Group
2004
 Inviati di Guerra – otto reportages fotografici 1991-2003 - Scavi Scaligeri. Centro Internazionale di Fotografia, Verona
 War by VII / Usa – Afghanistan – Iraq - War Photo Limited, Dubrovnik
 War – New York, Kabul, Baghdad - Visual Gallery photokina, Köln
2006 – Off Broadway - PAC Padiglione d'Arte Contemporanea, Milan
2008 – Magnum Photos 60 years - Stedelijk Museum Amsterdam
2009
 Magnum Contemporary – Future Icons - Atlas Gallery, London
 Bitter Fruit: Pictures from Afghanistan - Magnum Print Room, London
 Prix Pictet, Photography Prize 2009 - Purdy Hicks Gallery, London
 Prix Pictet 2009 Shortlist – Earth - Passage de Retz, Paris
2010
 Earth Tracks - Thessaloniki Museum of Photography, Thessaloninki
 Prix Pictet – Earth - Gallery of Photography, Dublin 
 Nominierung Prix Pictet 2009: Earth - Galerie Caprice Horn, Berlin
 Magnum. Shifting Media. New Role of Photography - C/O Berlin, Berlin
 Prix Pictet - Fondazione Forma per la Fotografia, Milan

References

External links
 
Anderson's profile at Magnum Photos
Why Magnum? A: Christopher Anderson
Chris Anderson Frontline Photographer
Interview: "A Conversation with Christopher Anderson" (2012)
Fair Game: An Interview with Christopher Anderson (GUP Magazine, 12 June 2013)

Videos
Magnum Photo's Christopher Anderson on QTV
A Lecture by Christopher Anderson, Part I

1970 births
Living people
Magnum photographers
American photographers
Artists from Kelowna
Photographers from Texas
People from Abilene, Texas